The 2017 Big East women's basketball tournament, also known as the 2017 Big East championship, was a tournament held from March 4 to 7, 2017, at Al McGuire Center on the Marquette University campus in Milwaukee. The host Marquette Golden Eagles won the tournament and with it an automatic trip to the NCAA women's tournament.

Seeds

Schedule

Source:

Bracket

See also

 2017 Big East men's basketball tournament

References

External links
Big East website

Big East women's basketball tournament
2017 in sports in Wisconsin
College basketball tournaments in Wisconsin
Basketball competitions in Milwaukee
Women's sports in Wisconsin